Ken Wookey may refer to:

Ken Wookey (footballer, born 1922), Welsh professional footballer
Ken Wookey (footballer, born 1946), Welsh professional footballer, his son